William E. Dulmage (August 17, 1883 - February 11, 1953) was a lyricist, composer, and music publisher in the first half of the twentieth century. In 1934, he composed "Tigers on Parade," which was dedicated to the Detroit Tigers and Mickey Cochrane. Dulmage wrote popular songs, including some World War I publications, and composed soundtracks for television shows and films.

Personal life
Dulmage was born on August 17, 1883, in Holly, Michigan. His father, Sidney O. Dulmage (1853-1930), was originally from Canada, and his mother, Harriet D. Dulmage (1858-1950), was born in Michigan. Will's high school education was supplemented with private music lessons in Oakland County, Michigan, where he lived with his parents.

Dulmage married Nina Bell Tallman (1883-1961) on September 23. The couple had one son together, William Tallman Dulmage (1919-1943). The family resided in Detroit, Michigan.

Dulmage died on February 11, 1953, in Dearborn, Michigan. He is buried in Oakview Cemetery in Royal Oak, Michigan.

Career

At the age of 25, Dulmage began work in the music department at Grinnell Brothers in Detroit. He most likely started off as a song plugger and moved his way up to manager of the Grinnell Brothers' Band and Orchestral department. Dulmage stayed with the company for 22 years. He later joined the Wurlitzer Company, serving as an executive in the sheet music department for twelve years. His wife was also employed at Wurlitzer, but in their accounting department.

Dulmage was a member of the Geo. & Wm Finzel's Band and Orchestra.

Throughout his songwriting career, he collaborated with lyricist Richard W. Pascoe. The two wrote the songs "Tenderly Think of Me" and "When It's Night Time in Nevada." The latter was featured in the movie Night Time in Nevada, which starred Roy Rogers. Besides this film, Dulmage also wrote the soundtracks to The Gene Autry Show (1948) and The Black Rider (1950).

Dulmage was the composer of three World War I songs: Say—You Haven't Sacrificed at All!, H-O-M-E Spells Where I Long to Be, and A Laddie in France is Dreaming, Little Girlie, of You.

In the 1940s, Will was the proprietor of a music store. Each of his family members had a role in the running of the store. His wife worked as the treasurer and his son was a salesman.

In January 1947, Dulmage joined the American Society of Composers, Authors and Publishers.

Selected works
On the Highway to Galilee: Sacred Song. With H.A. Kelly. 1934. D.L. Schroeder. 
When It's Night-Time in Nevada. With Richard W. Pascoe and H. O'Reilly Clint. 1931. Jenkins Music.  
Tenderly Think of Me. With Louis Forbstein. 1926. J.W. Jenkins Sons.  
Dreaming the Hours Away. 1926.  
Faded Love Letters. With Billy Jones, Ernest Hare, Luella Lockwood Moore, and Richard W. Pascoe. 1923. Brunswick. 
Say—You Haven't Sacrificed at All!. With J. Fred Lawton. 1918. Chas E. Roat Music Co.  
H-O-M-E Spells Where I Long To Be. With Eddie MacGrath and J. Fred Lawton. 1918. Eddie McGrath Publishing Co. 
A Laddie in France is Dreaming (Little Girlie of You). With Eddie McGrath. 1918. Eddie McGrath Publishing Co.

References

1883 births
1953 deaths
American composers
American male songwriters
People from Holly, Michigan
American male composers
20th-century American male musicians